This is a list of motorcycle-related clubs with articles on Wikipedia.

See also
List of outlaw motorcycle clubs

References

Motorcycle clubs